Jim Little (18 April 1938 – 8 October 1995) was an  Australian rules footballer who played with North Melbourne in the Victorian Football League (VFL).

Notes

External links 

1938 births
1995 deaths
Australian rules footballers from New South Wales
North Melbourne Football Club players